Several Canadian naval units have been named HMCS Chaleur.
  was a RCMP patrol vessel transferred to the Royal Canadian Navy in September 1939.  It was renamed Chaleur I and stationed at Saint Jean on Île-d'Orléans to inspect ships in the St. Lawrence River heading to Quebec City.
  (I) was a  that served with the Royal Canadian Navy from June–September 1954 before being sold to France as La Dieppoise.  The name Chaleur was chosen in honour of the service of Chaleur I and Chaleur II during World War II.
  (II) was a Bay-class minesweeper that served in the Royal Canadian Navy and later the Canadian Forces from 1957–1999. This ship used the same name as the first Chaleur but was issued a different pennant.

Royal Canadian Navy ship names